Fandokht-e Jadid (also Romanized as Fandokht-e Jadīd; also known as Fandokht and Findūkht) is a village in Shaskuh Rural District, Central District, Zirkuh County, South Khorasan Province, Iran. At the 2006 census, its population was 1,431, in 330 families.

References 

Populated places in Zirkuh County